Akçatekir is a town in Adana Province, Turkey.

Geography

Akçatekir is in the rural area of Pozantı District which is a part of Adana Province. The settled (winter) population is 2,483 as of 2012.

History

The earliest settlements date back to 200 years ago.  A sheikh from Turkestan founded a village which is slightly outside the present town. After the roads were constructed, the town was established in its present location. There were two quarters, in Akça (western portion) villagers lived all year long and in Bürücek  (eastern portion) city dwellers (mainly from Adana and Tarsus) spent the summers, escaping from the heat of Çukurova (Cilicia).

During Egyptian revolt in the first half of the 19th century, Egyptian armies briefly occupied Akçatekir. Ibrahim Pasha of Egypt built a fort in 1833 which is now known as the Bastion of İbrahim Pasha (İbrahim Paşa Tabyası).

Economy

Akçatekir had long been known as a summer resort town (so called yayla). But now it is on the motorway and the transportation to the cities at the south is a simple matter. So even in winters, people who work in the cities may prefer to settle in Akçatekir.

Status in 2014
According to Law act no 6360, all township municipalities will be abolished and they  will be merged into the district municipalities in 2014. Thus in 2014  Akçatekir  will be a part of  Pozantı municipality.

References

Populated places in Adana Province
Towns in Turkey
Yaylas in Turkey
Populated places in Pozantı